François Gachet (born 17 December 1965) is a French former professional downhill mountain biker. He won the UCI Downhill World Championships in 1994 and finished second the following year. He also finished first overall and won four events at the 1994 UCI Downhill World Cup.

References

External links

Living people
Downhill mountain bikers
1965 births
French male cyclists
French mountain bikers